Redrock Lake is located in Glacier National Park in the U. S. state of Montana. Mount Wilbur is west of Redrock Lake. Prior to entering Redrock Lake, Swiftcurrent Creek tumbles over Redrock Falls, which can be reached after an easy  hike by way of the Swiftcurrent Pass Trail.

See also
List of lakes in Glacier County, Montana

References

Lakes of Glacier National Park (U.S.)
Lakes of Glacier County, Montana